Stratigos is a Greek surname deriving from the Greek title for a general (cf. strategos). 

 Simone Stratigo (1733–1824) Greek-Italian mathematician
 Stefanos Stratigos (1926–2006), Greek actor
 Xenophon Stratigos (1869–1927), Greek general
 Susan Stratigos (1938-2013), Australian Feminist and Author

Greek-language surnames
Surnames